The Guildhall in Leicester, England, is a timber framed building, with the earliest part dating from c. 1390. The Guildhall once acted as the town hall for the city until the current one was commissioned in 1876. It is located in the old walled city, on a street now known as Guildhall Lane. It was used first as the meeting place for the Guild of Corpus Christi and then later for the more formal Corporation of Leicester. The hall was used for many purposes, including council meetings, feasts, as a courtroom, and for theatrical performances; the ultimatum given to the city during English Civil War was discussed here. It is a Grade I listed building, and the surrounding area, also including the Cathedral of St Martin's, is a conservation area, one of three in Leicester.

History

The Great Hall was built around 1390 as the meeting place of the Guild of Corpus Christi; the guild was a group of businessmen and gentry who had religious connections. The Guildhall was used for banquets, festivals, and as a home for a priest who prayed for the souls of Guild members in the nearby St Martin's Church. The Corporation of Leicester bought the Guildhall by the end of the 14th century.

It is reputed that William Shakespeare appeared here in the late 16th century. In recognition of this, the television company, Maya Vision, brought the Royal Shakespeare Company to perform at the Guildhall as part of its 2003 series for the BBC, In Search of Shakespeare, written and narrated by the historian, Michael Wood. Part of the Shakespeare legend is that Shakespeare first came across the tale of King Leir whilst appearing at the Guildhall and this inspired him to write his own play King Lear. There is, however, no actual evidence to support this, although the legend of King Leir is associated with Leicester.

During the English Civil War the Mayor and corporation received a demand from Prince Rupert for £2,000. The decision was made at the Guildhall to offer a loan of £500 and made an appeal to King Charles I. In May 1645 the King in attempt to divert attention away from Oxford positioned an army of 6,000 men outside the city walls on 29 May 1645. Again important decisions regarding the fate of the city were to be decided in the Guildhall. On 30 May 1645 the Royalist Army made demand after demand to the city, who played for time. In the end Prince Rupert attacked at 3:00 pm. The City walls were breached, and the last stand made by the defenders outside the Guildhall and St Martins. The Royalists then entered the Guildhall looting the town's archives, and mace and seal. The Royalist victory was reversed a couple of weeks later with the defeat at Naseby.

Records also show that entertainment expenses were paid for such items as wine, beer for Oliver Cromwell. Although this does not prove Oliver Cromwell stayed at the Guildhall, it is highly probable that he visited several times. The coat of arms of King Charles I can be seen today inside the Mayor's Parlour.

The Guildhall library in England, which includes the New Testament in Greek from the 15th century, was established in 1632, when the town library was moved into the east wing of the building. Leicester's first police force had its station in the Guildhall from 1836.

The Corporation moved to the new Leicester Town Hall in 1876. Apart from the police station, it was later used as a school. However, the building was becoming increasingly dilapidated, and by the 1920s there were plans to demolish the building. After the intervention of the Leicestershire Archaeological and Historical Society, the council began restoration work on the building, finishing it in 1926, when the Guildhall was opened as a museum.

At a press conference in the Guildhall on 4 February 2013, it was confirmed that archaeologists had discovered Richard III's remain in the nearby Greyfriars 'Car Park'. The former Alderman Newton's Greencoat School building, close to the grave site, opened as a permanent Richard III museum, on 24 July 2014.

Present day
The Guildhall is used as a performance venue as well as a museum.

Ghosts
With five reported ghosts, the Guildhall is reputedly Leicester's most haunted building. Because of its reported hauntings, it has appeared on various TV programmes, including being investigated on the television show Most Haunted.

See also
 Guild
 Guildhall

References

External links

Leicester Museums page

Buildings and structures completed in 1390
Grade I listed buildings in Leicestershire
History of Leicester
Buildings and structures in Leicester
Tourist attractions in Leicestershire
Grade I listed government buildings
Leicester
City and town halls in Leicestershire
Museums in Leicester
History museums in Leicestershire
Prison museums in the United Kingdom
Reportedly haunted locations in East Midlands
Guildhalls in the United Kingdom
Timber framed buildings in England